Thubana albisignis is a moth in the family Lecithoceridae. It is found in Taiwan.

References

Moths described in 1914
Thubana